N J Nandini (born 5 August 1991) is a Carnatic music vocalist from Trivandrum. Nandini was awarded the Chembai Puraskaram, the Isai Chudar title and a M S Subbalakshmi fellowship at the young age of 23. Nandini, who comes from a family that has a musical lineage,  has been nurtured by gurus such as Prof Parassala Ponnammal, Prof P R Kumarakerala Varma, Dr S Bhagyalakshmi and Dr M N Moorthy.

Nandini, who is the recipient of 28 prestigious awards, has performed in over 900 concerts in India and abroad.

Early life and family

NJ Nandini was born into a musical family. Her late grandfather Vechoor N Hariharasubramania Iyer was a renowned Carnatic vocalist and teacher. Her uncle Vechoor C Sankar is a well-known Carnatic singer and her brother, NJ Nandagopal, a Charted Accountant by profession, is a talented singer and mridangist.

As a child, Nandini’s parents, C Neelakantan and S Jayanthi, would take her to nearly all the concerts in town. She could identify ragas and sing small tunes from the age of 3. Noticing her flair for music, her parents ensured she received the very best of training in the field.

She has been nurtured over the years by eminent gurus such as Padmasri B Ponnammal, Prof, PR Kumarakerala Varma, Dr S Bhagyalekshmy and Dr MN Moorthy. Set to receive her Doctorate in Music by November 2022, Nandini is a guest lecturer at Sree Swathi Thirunal Govt. College of Music, Thiruvananthapuram.

Career

 The youngest musician to secure "A" grade from All India Radio Trivandrum
 Winner of All India Radio National Music Competition in     2009
 Winner of the title Ragaratnam Yuva, from Carnatic     Music Reality Show in Amrita TV
 Ist Runner Up in Jaya TV – Pothys Carnatic Music Idol 2011
 Ist Runner Up in Jaya TV – Vivel Carnatic Music Idol 2012
 The People’s Choice Award in Jaya TV – Vivel Carnatic Music Idol     2012
 1st Rank Holder- MA Music, Kerala     University
 Delegate to China, from Ministry of Youth Affairs and     Sports, Govt of India in 2014
 ICCR Empanelled Artist since the year 2012
 Recipient of CCRT Cultural Talent Scholarship since 2002

 She has rendered songs for various devotional albums, documentaries, short films and title songs for various television programmes.

 She has composed music for various creative concepts & stage shows such as Bharatha Nandini – Tribute to Mother land, Hari Bhakti Navakam – Nava Vidha Bhakthi Krithis, Bharathiyin Kannamma (Poems of Bharathiyar) Vaggeya Vaibhavam (celebrating illustrious composers of Carnatic Music) and Abhyaasa Gaanam (Mic less practice session), with her students.

  She has composed many dance musical pieces and collaborated with musicians and danseuses.

 She has conceptualized and curated popular musical series such as Malayalam May, Padmanabham and Out of the Box on her YouTube channel.
 She has recorded Soundarya Lahari, 100 verses in 100 ragas composed by KR Kedaranathan.

 She turned playback singer in M Jayachandran’s movie Kambhoji, wherein she sang two Kathakali padams.

Awards, honors and recognition

 2016 – Mavelikkara Prabhakara Varma Smaraka Yuva Sangeetha Puraskara – Sri Poornathrayesha Sangeetha Sabha, Thrippunithura
 2014 – ISAI CHUDAR – Kartik Fine Arts, Chennai
 2014 – Chembai Puraskar  – Cultural Department, Government of Kerala
 2013 – Madurai Mani Iyer Award  – Sri Krishna Gana Sabha, Chennai
 2013 – Prof P Mahalingam Endowment Award  – Narada Gana Sabha, Chennai
 2013 – Shanmukhananda Bharat Ratna  Dr M S Subbulakshmi Fellowship  – Shanmukhananda Sangeetha Sabha, Mumbai
 2013 – Best Vocalist- 2013  –  Kuwait Carnatic Music Forum
 2012 – Best Vocalist - Female – The Spirit of Youth Music and Dance Festival, The Music Academy, Madras
 2010 – Sangeetha Shri – Travancore Music Society, Harippad
 2010 – Yuva Sangeetha Prathibha Puraskar – Swaranjali
 2009 – Ragaratnam Yuva – Amrita TV
 2009 – Dr. L Muthayya Bhagavathar Award – Edapally Sangeetha Sadas, Ernakulam
 2009 – Best Female Singer Award – Bharathiya Vidya Bhavan
 2008 – MLV Srividya Sangeetha Puraskar – MLV Srividya Charitable Society, Trivandrum
 2008 – Yuva Sri Kala Bharathi – Bharathi Yuva Kendra, Madurai
 2008 – Kalathilakom – Bharathiya Vidya Bhavan, Trivandrum
 2008 – Award of Accreditation – Sri Sankara council for Assessment & Accreditation, Kalady
 2007 – Venuganam Award – Neelakanta Sivan Sangeetha Sabha, Trivandrum
 2005 – Augustine Joseph Memorial Award – Poornathrayeesha Sangeetha Sabha, Thrippunithura
 2005 – Uma Maheswaran Memorial Award – Chembai Memorial Trust, Trivandrum
 2005 – Vaikom Vasudevan Nair Memorial Award – Vaikathashtami Festival
 2004 – Best Young Talent Award – VDS Arts Academy, Chennai

References 
2. Vaggeya Vaibhavam: celebrating timeless music of the legends 3. For N J Nandini, there’s no place like home

1991 births
Living people
Singers from Thiruvananthapuram
Women Carnatic singers
Carnatic singers
Film musicians from Kerala
Indian women classical singers
Malayalam playback singers
Indian women playback singers
21st-century Indian singers
21st-century Indian women singers
Women musicians from Kerala